Gore Mutual Insurance Company is a Canadian home, auto and business insurance company. Founded in 1839, Gore Mutual is Canada's oldest property and casualty insurer, with over $475 million in premiums and over $1.1 billion in assets. Gore Mutual has two offices in Canada, with a third Toronto, Ontario office under development. The head office is located in Cambridge, Ontario and a western office is located in Vancouver, British Columbia.  The firm has a favourable reputation with the Insurance Brokers Association of Ontario (IBAO).

History

Pre Canadian Confederation
After a failed attempt in 1837, Gore Mutual Insurance (known at that time as "The Gore District Mutual Fire Insurance Company") was created by an unknown business man from Brantford on June 18, 1839 after rediscovering the subscription book that was originally created in 1837. Gore Mutual began business with only one paid officer William A. Walker, who also held the role of secretary-treasurer. In November 1839 William A. Walker was also given the title of travelling agent. He was responsible for travelling on horseback in order to expand Gore Mutual's operations across the Galt district. With the passing of new Legislature in 1842, Mutual Insurance companies were able to expand their business into districts where no mutual fire insurance provider existed. Gore Mutual took advantage of this by expanding into Toronto, Simcoe, Oakville, Port Dover, Colbourne, Yarmouth and London over a two-year period.

Modernization of Galt Fire Department
At the annual meeting in 1858 members authorized the board to reward fire companies who were called to assist with fires, and those who successfully saved the property. This new legislation was the first step in developing more efficient firefighting methods in the Galt region.

Pre Confederation Modernization
The 1860s were a modernization period for Gore Mutual. In 1863 under new leadership, Gore Mutual moved the company to a new office building in Galt. In 1865 Gore Mutual implemented a new structure on charging tariffs that allowed the company to charge higher premiums on policies that were deemed high risk a method that many insurance companies use today. In 1866 new agencies were established in Preston, St. Mary's, Wroxeter, Lucknow, Princeton, Plattsville, County of Wentworth, County of Halton, Embro, West Zorra, Woodstock, Brantford and its surrounding County.

After Canadian Confederation
By mid-1870 the number of active Gore Mutual policies had grown to over 6,000. By this time Gore had expanded into Central and Eastern Ontario. In the late 1870s Gore Mutual started to cancel policies that were deemed too high of a risk. Gore Mutual also began breaking ties with agencies that were in remote areas that were located to far from the head office in Galt.
By the beginning of the 1880s Gore Mutual had over 4,500 policies; by 1899 that number had grown to over 13,000 policies. Gore Mutual's portfolio was growing at a rate of 500 policies a year. The value of its insured properties during that time rose from $4,000,000 in 1880 to $15,670,000 in 1899. Meanwhile, British and American fire and casualty insurance companies began expanding into Canada during this time.

1895, Gore Mutual's new building in Galt was completed. The building stands over 80 feet tall and was built with dark red bricks and sandstone trim. It is revolutionary with hot water heating as well as gas and electrical light. The building quickly emerged as a local landmark for the people of Galt.

1914, Gore Mutual donated $50,000, which was the previous year's, profits to help aid the War Effort Patriotic Fund.

1936, Gore Mutual's current building was completed. Built by Scottish stonemasons using local, handpicked stone, it was built on a hill top surrounded by gardens. Lieutenant-Governor Herbert A. Bruce officially opened the building.

1939, Gore Mutual turned 100 years old and had over 2.4 million dollars CAD in assets.

World War 2
During World War II, Gore Mutual donated $100,000 of its profits to the government of Canada in order to aid the war effort. This money was to be spent however the government saw fit. Not only did Gore Mutual donate to the cause but every employee gave an additional portion of their income during the war to further aid the efforts of the Canadian troops. During this time, eight Gore Mutual employees served, all of whom survived; however two of them were severely wounded during their time of service. By the end of the war, Gore Mutual had victory bonds amounting to a total of $525,000 which is worth roughly $7,297,550 today.

Post War
In the early 1970s Gore Mutual hired Brantford architects Mark Musselman, McIntyre & Combe to design a new building that was to be attached to the existing head office built in 1937. The two buildings are connected by a glass passageway that extends 60 feet from the old to new building.

In 1968 Gore Mutual purchased its first Honeywell Computer, becoming one of the first companies in Canada to use a computerized policy handling for automobile insurance.
The late 1970s were the age of the computer for Gore Mutual. Cathode Ray Tube (CRT) systems were used in the claims department for the purpose of processing personal and commercial lines.
In the 1990s Gore Mutual introduced a 24-hour emergency claims service in order to help customers and brokers at all times. Also during this time, new estimating software was introduced to allow adjusters to prepare quotes with greater speed and accuracy.
In 1998 Gore Mutual created the Gore Mutual Foundation. The foundation provides funding to hundreds of health, welfare, education, cultural, environmental and charitable activities in communities across Canada.

Gore Mutual Insurance Foundation
For over 100 years Gore Mutual has been donating to charities in the communities where they do business. In 1998 Gore Mutual incorporated the Gore Mutual Insurance Foundation. Incorporating the Gore Mutual Foundation registered it as private charity funding statues, which has the benefit of being tax free allowing for an increase in yearly donations. There are two ways to apply for donations,
 Through a brokerage
 Charities can directly apply to Gore Mutual

Since 1998 Gore Mutual Foundation has donated over $12,000,000 to nearly 1,000 charities. In 2008 the Gore Mutual Foundation donated $500,000 to the Cambridge Memorial Hospital. This is one of the largest donations ever received by the Cambridge Memorial Hospital Foundation. The donation was used to allow 300 more screening cases each year and to reduce wait times for the endoscopy unit. In 2011 Gore Mutual Foundation donated $450,000 to nearly 120 charities Canada wide. In 2012 Gore Mutual pledged $1,000,000 to the Gore Mutual Foundation. In 2020, CanadaHelps, in partnership with Gore Mutual Foundation, made it possible for Canadians to double the impact of their charitable donations towards COVID-19 relief efforts. Each donation to the CanadaHelps COVID-19 Cause Funds was doubled by Gore Mutual Foundation, which committed $2 million in matching funds to be split between COVID-19 Community Care Fund and COVID-19 Healthcare and Hospital Fund.

Paperless Office Movement 
In 2002 Gore Mutual Insurance implemented a paperless office objective. Within 10 months, Gore Mutual went from 70% paper: 30% electronic to 70% electronic: 30% paper. The quick success of the paperless movement was due to 80% of Gore Mutual staff being under the age of 35. Since 2002 the percentage of paper used has decreased sufficiently. Underwriting and claims departments are fully paperless. Gore Mutual's success implementing a paperless office has inspired some insurance brokerages to also turn their office into a paperless office.

References

Insurance companies of Canada
Financial services companies established in 1839
Canadian companies established in 1839